Jean Dard (June 21, 1789 — October 1, 1833) was a French teacher in Saint-Louis, Senegal who, in 1817, opened the first French-language school in Africa. He also compiled the first French-Wolof dictionary and grammar (1846).

Dard developed a new approach for teaching French as a foreign language, the "mutual method" or méthode de traduction (translation method), based on a learning approach pioneered by Aloïsius Édouard Camille Gaultier, by which children were taught to read and write in their native Wolof and then learned French by translating. According to Jean-Benoît Nadeau and Julie Barlow, Dard's method was "very modern and very effective, and Dard was said to have achieved remarkable results with it."

In Senegal, Dard took a signare by whom he had a son.  He then returned to France for reasons of health and married Charlotte-Adélaïde Picard—an eyewitness of the wreck of the Méduse—by whom he had three additional children. Dard served as a teacher and town secretary in Bligny-lès-Beaune. The Dards returned to Senegal in 1832, but he died there a year later.

References

French lexicographers
1789 births
1833 deaths
19th-century lexicographers